Come Play with Me is a 1968 Italian drama film directed by Salvatore Samperi. It was listed to compete at the 1968 Cannes Film Festival, but the festival was cancelled due to the events of May 1968 in France.  The English title is not a translation of the Italian one, which translates into English as "Thanks, Auntie".

Plot
Alvise (Lou Castel) is a young man who thinks he is paralyzed. He receives treatment for his psychological problem. His father leaves Alvise for a few days in the care of Aunt Lea (Lisa Gastoni), who is Alvise's mother's sister. Alvise becomes infatuated with his aunt and Lea also reciprocates gradually.  Lea breaks off her relationship with Stefano (Gabriele Ferzetti) to be with her nephew. Alvise promises to make love to Lea if she plays with him and beats him at any of the games. Lea and Alvise play a number of games leading to the ultimate game of euthanasia.

Cast
 Lisa Gastoni as Aunt Lea
 Lou Castel as Alvise
 Gabriele Ferzetti as Stefano
 Luisa De Santis as Nicoletta (the singer)
 Massimo Sarchielli as Massimo
 Nicoletta Rizzi as the secretary of Alvise's father
 Anita Dreyer as Barbara

References

External links

1968 films
1960s Italian-language films
1968 drama films
Italian black-and-white films
Films directed by Salvatore Samperi
Films scored by Ennio Morricone
1960s Italian films